Kristína Svarinská (born 14 May 1989) is a Slovak actress and dubbing artist. She had a leading role in the most visited film in Slovak cinemas in 2011, Lóve. Svarinská starred alongside Juraj Bača on the first season finale of Rex. She plays ensemble cast as Ema Farkašová in 2018 medical drama Sestričky.

Selected filmography 
Panelák (television, 2008)
Lóve (2011)
Colette (2013)
10 Rules (2014)
In Silence (2014)
The Seven Ravens (2015)
Rex (television, 2017)
Sestričky (television, 2018)
Shotgun Justice (2019)
Revír (web series, 2023)

References

External links

1989 births
Living people
Slovak film actresses
Slovak television actresses
Actors from Bratislava
21st-century Slovak actresses